"Good Dancers" is a 2003 song by Australian alternative rock duo The Sleepy Jackson, released on 13 October 2003 as the second single from the album Lovers. The song charted at #71 in the UK.

Music videos
Two music videos were produced for the song. The first was directed by Nash Edgerton and depicts a janitor (played by Dan Wyllie) in a hospital walking into a sparse room and eventually dancing with a fellow nurse (played by Rita Kalnejais). The second, produced for the song's American release, has a different narrative and centers around angels in a forest running and dancing. The music video was nominated for Best Video at the ARIA Music Awards of 2001.

Track listing
UK CD single

 "Good Dancers" (radio edit)
 "Come to This" (accoutic)
 "Good Dancers – Acoustic Radio 1 Blue Room"
 "Bucket of Love"
 "Raindrop"

Charts

References

2003 songs
2003 singles
Songs written by Luke Steele (musician)
The Sleepy Jackson songs